MS Fridtjof Nansen is a Norwegian cruise ship (though marketed as an "expedition ship"). It is a hybrid powered Polar Class 6 ship built by Kleven Yards Ulsteinvik for Hurtigruten.

History 
Hurtigruten AS tentatively ordered in April 2016 two newbuildings at Kleven Verft, which should be delivered in July 2018 and 2019.
Fridtjof Nansen was officially ordered on 30. June 2016, together with her sister ship Roald Amundsen, at Kleven Verft. Fridtjof Nansen should originally be delivered in summer 2019. Kleven yard ran into financial difficulties and ended up being bought outright by Hurtigruten. The ship was launched on 9. December 2018. The first cruises should have started in April 2020 from Hamburg. Due to COVID-19 the planned cruises had to be cancelled.

On 11 January 2022, the ship ran aground while on a voyage from Lofoten to Flåm. None of her two-hundred-thirty-three passengers and one-hundred-sixty-five crew were injured. The passengers were taken off the ship and transported to Ålesund. After repairs the ship resumed cruising with passengers on the 1st of June, departing from Reykjavik.

Technology 
Fridtjof Nansen is the second expedition ship of its class with hybrid power, a combination of diesel-electrical power and pure electrical power, fed from accumulators. The hull is particularly suited for polar regions (Polar class 6) and has a bow like an axe. The propulsion occurs via two Azimuth_thrusters.

Sister ships 
The development and construction of Fridtjof Nansen is part of a 850 million dollar investment of Hurtigruten AS with the objective to have the most environment-friendly expedition fleet of the world. The first vessel Roald Amundsen is in operation since July 2019. A third ship was ordered in October 2018 and should be delivered in the 2nd quarter of 2021.This order was later cancelled.

References

Weblinks 
 - Info about the Vessel
 - MS Fridtjof Nansen Overview
 News
 Hurtigruten ASA Official homepage - MS Fridtjof Nansen

Passenger ships of Norway
Hurtigruten
2018 ships
Ships built in Ulstein
Maritime incidents in 2022